Harri Juhani Haatainen (born 5 January 1978) is a Finnish javelin thrower, born in Lapua. His personal best throw is 86.63 metres, achieved in August 2001 in Gateshead.

International competitions

Seasonal bests by year
1993 - 62.74
1994 - 73.48
1995 - 77.50
1996 - 82.52
1997 - 80.16
1998 - 79.07
1999 - 83.02
2000 - 86.10
2001 - 86.63
2002 - 84.28
2003 - 73.34
2004 - 72.16
2005 - 74.39
2006 - 77.32
2007 - 80.88
2008 - 81.18
2009 - 81.22
2010 - 84.53
2011 - 81.01
2012 - 79.14
2013 - 75.82
2014 - 77.61
2015 - 75.54

References

sports-reference

1978 births
Living people
People from Lapua
Finnish male javelin throwers
Athletes (track and field) at the 2000 Summer Olympics
Olympic athletes of Finland
World Athletics Championships athletes for Finland
Sportspeople from South Ostrobothnia
20th-century Finnish people
21st-century Finnish people